Datuk Seri Panglima Yong Teck Lee (born 3 October 1958) is a Malaysian politician who served as the 10th Chief Minister of Sabah from May 1996 to May 1998, Deputy Chief Minister of Sabah from July 1990 to December 1995, Member of Parliament (MP) for Gaya from November 1999 and Member of the Sabah State Legislative Assembly (MLA) for Likas from April 1985 to September 2002. He has served as Nominated MLA of Sabah since October 2020 and 1st and founding President of the Sabah Progressive Party (SAPP) since January 1994 and is Deputy Chairman of its coalition, the ruling Perikatan Nasional (PN).

Political career
Yong became the Chief Minister of Sabah on 28 May 1996 to serve in a two-year rotation arranged by the Barisan Nasional (BN) coalition in the state.  He had previously served as Deputy Chief Minister. In 1994 he resigned from the United Sabah Party (PBS), citing dissatisfaction with its leadership, and established the SAPP; however, the new party became a member of the Barisan Nasional (BN) coalition led in Sabah by the PBS. Lee led the SAPP in bolting from Barisan Nasional in 2008.

Before entering politics, Yong was a lawyer, having studied in London.

Honours
  :
  Commander of the Order of Meritorious Service (PJN) - Datuk (1996)
  :
  Commander of the Order of Kinabalu (PGDK) - Datuk (1990)
  Grand Commander of the Order of Kinabalu (SPDK) - Datuk Seri Panglima (2007)

References

Living people
1958 births
People from Sabah
Malaysian politicians of Chinese descent
Malaysian people of Hakka descent
People from Longchuan
20th-century Malaysian lawyers
Malaysian political party founders
Sabah Progressive Party politicians
Members of the Dewan Rakyat
Members of the Sabah State Legislative Assembly
Chief Ministers of Sabah
Sabah state ministers
Commanders of the Order of Meritorious Service
Grand Commanders of the Order of Kinabalu
Commanders of the Order of Kinabalu